Raaj Mahal (Hindi: राज महल) is a 1982 Hindi movie. Produced by K.B. Lamchhane and directed by K.Parvez. The film stars Vinod Khanna, Neetu Singh, Danny Denzongpa in lead roles and Amjad Khan as main antagonist. The film's music is by Kalyanji Anandji

Synopsis
Maharaja Uday Singh is the king of Ajaygarh. He has two sons, Vikram and Sangram. One day, the sly minister Durjan Singh (Amjad Khan) assassinates the king. Durjan Singh sends his men to eliminate the king's family. The King's loyal man (Kader Khan) runs away with the queen and the children. The queen jumps into the river with her younger son and both fall apart. On the other hand, Khan handed over the eldest son to a tribe chief and dies. Vikram (Vinod Khanna) grows up and fights for justice against Durjan Singh. Sangram (Danny Denzongpa) becomes a dacoit. Both brothers face off against each other.

Cast
Vinod Khanna as Prince Vikram Singh
Neetu Singh as Princess Ratna Singh
Danny Denzongpa as Sangram Singh
Amjad Khan as Raja Durjan Singh
Kader Khan as Khan
Om Shivpuri as Sardar Badshah Khan
Jagdeep as Veer Singh 
Urmila Bhatt as Rajmata (Vikram & Sangram's Mother) 
Ram Mohan as Zalim Singh
Yusuf Khan as Sher Singh
Jayashree T as Dancer

Music

Track listing

References

 http://www.gomolo.com/raj-mahal-movie/5478
 http://www.hindigeetmala.net/movie/raj_mahal.htm
 http://ibosnetwork.com/asp/filmbodetails.asp?id=Raaj+Mahal

External links 
 

1982 films
1980s Hindi-language films
Films scored by Kalyanji Anandji